is a tram station in Kōchi, Kōchi Prefecture, Japan.

Lines
Tosa Electric Railway
Ino Line

Railway stations in Kōchi Prefecture
Railway stations in Japan opened in 1906